The Anjouan scops owl (Otus capnodes) is an owl endemic to the island of Anjouan in the Comoro Islands.

Description
The Anjouan scops owl occurs in grey and rufous colour phases and has very small ear-tufts compared to other scops owls. The grey form is sooty grey with fine buff bars on the head and neck, a dark brown face with fine streaks and brown underparts with very fine brown streaks and vermiculations. The tail and flight feathers are sooty grey. The rufous form is browner and the marking contrasts more with the plumage.

Voice
The call of the Anjouan scops owl is a distinctive drawn-out whistle, which is repeated often with short interludes. It has been likened to the "pee-oo" call of the grey plover. The local name is "badanga".

Distribution and habitat
The Anjouan scops owl is found only on the island of Anjouan, where it occurs in the remaining fragments of native upland forest, degraded forest and plantations. It appears to be dependent on large trees situated on steep slopes with cavities for nesting and roosting.

Behaviour 
Little is known, but it probably nests and roosts in tree cavities and feeds mainly on insects.

Conservation and status
This species was rediscovered in June 1992, after an absence of records dating back to 1886. It has an estimated population of less than 400. It is classified as "Critically Endangered" because its range is restricted to such a small area, which is being rapidly deforested. However, later analyses have since downlisted it to Endangered.  Bristol Conservation and The Science Foundation have currently conducted surveys on the island to determine how many owls remain.

References

External links
BirdLife Species Factsheet

Anjouan scops owl
Endemic birds of the Comoros
Anjouan
Critically endangered fauna of Africa
Anjouan scops owl
Taxa named by John Henry Gurney Sr.